HK Dynamo Mayak is a bandy club in Krasnoturyinsk, Russia. The club was founded in 1948 and has earlier been playing in the Russian Bandy Super League, the top-tier of Russian bandy. The home games are played at Stadium Mayak in Krasnoturyinsk. The city is now interested in making it equipped with artificial ice. The club colours are red, white and blue.

References

Bandy clubs in Russia
Bandy clubs in the Soviet Union
Sport in Sverdlovsk Oblast
Bandy clubs established in 1948
1948 establishments in Russia
Krasnoturyinsk